Alejandro Javier Larrea (born 5 December 1966) is a Uruguayan  professional football manager and former player.

Career
Larrea earned two caps for Uruguay national football team in 1992. On 21 June 1992, he made his debut and scored his first goal in a 2–0 win over Australia. He played another match on 4 July 1992 in a 3–1 win over Ecuador.

In July 1999, Larrea transferred to Chinese Jia-A League side Beijing Guoan. On 25 July 1999, he scored his first goal in China in a 3–3 away draw against Shenyang Haishi. He joined Chinese second-tier club Guangzhou Geely in April 2001. On 5 May, he made his debut for Guangzhou and scored his first goal in a 1–1 away draw against Jiangsu Sainty. Larrea joined another Jia-A League club Tianjin Teda, which was then coached by Uruguayan manager Nelson Agresta, on 28 July 2001. He left the club in August, playing just two FA Cup matches for Tianjin in the two legs of the third round of 2001 Chinese FA Cup.

On 23 December 2013, Larrea was appointed as the assistant coach of Nelson Agresta for China League One club Hebei Zhongji. He became the caretaker manager of the club for the rest of the season on 11 August 2014 after Agresta was sacked. 

On 24 August 2015, Larrea was hired to serve as Óscar Ramírez's assistant in the Costa Rica national football team.

References

1966 births
Living people
People from Montevideo
Uruguayan footballers
Uruguay international footballers
Uruguayan football managers
Montevideo Wanderers F.C. players
C.A. Progreso players
Sud América players
Central Español players
Estudiantes de La Plata footballers
C.D. Atlético Marte footballers
Aurora F.C. players
Deportivo Saprissa players
Beijing Guoan F.C. players
Guangzhou F.C. players
Tianjin Jinmen Tiger F.C. players
A.D. Ramonense players
Uruguayan expatriate footballers
Expatriate footballers in Argentina
Expatriate footballers in El Salvador
Expatriate footballers in Guatemala
Expatriate footballers in Costa Rica
Expatriate footballers in China
Expatriate football managers in Costa Rica
Expatriate football managers in China
Puntarenas F.C. managers
Hebei F.C. managers
Association football forwards